The grass snake (Natrix natrix), sometimes called the ringed snake or water snake, is a Eurasian semi-aquatic non-venomous colubrid snake. It is often found near water and feeds almost exclusively on amphibians.

Subspecies
Many subspecies are recognized, including:

Natrix natrix helvetica (Lacépède, 1789) was formerly treated as a subspecies, but following genetic analysis it was recognised in August 2017 as a separate species, Natrix helvetica, the barred grass snake. Four other subspecies were transferred from N. natrix to N. helvetica, becoming N. helvetica cettii, N. helvetica corsa, N. helvetica lanzai and N. helvetica sicula.

Description

The grass snake is typically dark green or brown in colour with a characteristic yellow or whitish collar behind the head, which explains the alternative name ringed snake. The colour may also range from grey to black, with darker colours being more prevalent in colder regions, presumably owing to the thermal benefits of being dark in colour. The underside is whitish with irregular blocks of black, which are useful in recognizing individuals.

Distribution
The grass snake is widely distributed in mainland Europe, ranging from mid Scandinavia to southern Italy. It is also found in the Middle East and northwestern Africa.

Grass snakes in Britain were thought to belong to the subspecies N. n. helvetica but have been reclassified as the barred grass snake Natrix helvetica. Any records of N. natrix in Britain are now considered to have originated from imported specimens.

Ecology

Feeding

Grass snakes mainly prey on amphibians, especially the common toad and the common frog, although they may also occasionally eat ants and larvae. Captive snakes have been observed taking earthworms offered by hand, but dead prey items are never taken. The snake will search actively for prey, often on the edges of the water, using sight and sense of smell (using Jacobson's organ). They consume prey live without using constriction.

Habitat
Grass snakes are strong swimmers and may be found close to freshwater, although there is evidence individual snakes often do not need bodies of water throughout the entire season.

The preferred habitat appears to be open woodland and "edge" habitat, such as field margins and woodland borders, as these may offer adequate refuge while still affording ample opportunity for thermoregulation through basking. Pond edges are also favoured and the relatively high chance of observing this secretive species in such areas may account for their perceived association with ponds and water.

Grass snakes, like most reptiles, are at the mercy of the thermal environment and need to overwinter in areas which are not subject to freezing. Thus, they typically spend the winter underground where the temperature is relatively stable.

Reproduction

As spring approaches, the males emerge first and spend much of the day basking in an effort to raise body temperature and thereby metabolism. This may be a tactic to maximise sperm production, as the males mate with the females as soon as they emerge up to two weeks later in April, or earlier if environmental temperatures are favourable. The leathery-skinned eggs are laid in batches of eight to 40 in June to July and hatch after about 10 weeks. To survive and hatch, the eggs require a temperature of at least , but preferably , with high humidity. Areas of rotting vegetation, such as compost heaps, are preferred locations.

Migration
After breeding in summer, snakes tend to hunt and may range widely during this time, moving up to several hundred metres in a day. Prey items tend to be large compared to the size of the snake, and this impairs the movement ability of the snake. Snakes that have recently eaten rarely move any significant distance and will stay in one location, basking to optimize their body temperature until the prey item has been digested. Individual snakes may only need two or three significant prey items throughout an entire season.

Ecdysis (moulting)

Ecdysis occurs at least once during the active season. As the outer skin wears and the snake grows, the new skin forms underneath the old, including the eye scales which may turn a milky blue/white colour at this time—referred to as being 'in blue'. The blue-white colour comes from an oily secretion between the old and new skins; the snake's coloration will also look dull, as though the animal is dusty. This process affects the eyesight of the snakes and they do not move or hunt during this time; they are also, in common with most other snakes, more aggressive. The outer skin is eventually sloughed in one piece (inside-out) and normal movement activity is resumed.

Defence
In defence they can produce a garlic-smelling fluid from the anal glands, and feign death (thanatosis) by becoming completely limp when they may also secrete blood (autohaemorrhage) from the mouth and nose. They may also perform an aggressive display in defence, hissing and striking without opening the mouth. They rarely bite in defense and lack venomous fangs. When caught they often regurgitate the contents of their stomachs.

Grass snakes display a rare defensive behavior involving raising the front of the body and flattening the head and neck so that it resembles a cobra's hood, although the geographic ranges of grass snakes and of cobras overlap very little. However, the fossil record shows that the extinct European cobra Naja romani occurs in Miocene-aged strata of France, Germany, Austria, Romania, and Ukraine and thus overlapped with Natrix species including the extinct Natrix longivertebrata, suggesting that the grass snake's behavioral mimicry of cobras is a fossil behavior, although it may protect against predatory birds which migrate to Africa for the winter and encounter cobras there.

Protection and threats
The species has various predator species, including corvids, storks, owls and perhaps other birds of prey, foxes, and the domestic cat.

In Denmark it is protected, as all five species of reptiles were protected in 1981. Two of the subspecies are considered critically endangered: N. n. cetti (Sardinian grass snake) and N. n. schweizeri.

Mythology

Baltic 

In the Baltic mythology, the grass snake (Lithuanian: žaltys, Latvian: zalktis) is seen as a sacred animal. It was frequently kept as a pet, living under a married couple's bed or in a special place near the hearth. Supposedly, snakes ate food given to them by hand.

After the Christianization of Lithuania and Latvia, the grass snake still retained some mythological significance. In spite of the serpent's symbolic meaning as a symbol of evil in Christianity, in Latvia and Lithuania there were various folk beliefs, dating even to the late 19th century, that killing grass snakes might bring grave misfortune or that an injured snake will take revenge on the offender. The ancient Baltic belief of grass snakes as household spirits transformed into a belief that there is a snake (known or not to the inhabitants) living under every house; if it leaves, the house will burn down. Common Latvian folk sayings include "who kills a grass snake, kills his happiness" and "when the Saulė sees a dead grass snake, she cries for 9 days".

Well-known literary works based on these traditions include Lithuanian folk tale Eglė the Queen of Serpents (Eglė žalčių karalienė) and the Latvian folk fairytale "The grass snake's bride" (Zalkša līgava). These works include another common theme in Baltic mythology: that grass snakes wear crowns (note grass snake's yellow spots) and that there is a king of snakes who wears a golden crown. In some traditions the king of snakes changes every year; he drops his crown in spring and the other snakes fight for it (possibly based on the mating of grass snakes).

Today grass snakes hold a meaning of house blessing among many Latvians and Lithuanians. One tradition is to put a bowl of milk near a snake's place of residence, although there is no evidence of a grass snake ever drinking milk. Driven by late 19th century and 20th century Romantic nationalism, grass snake motifs in Latvia have gained a meaning of education and wisdom, and are common ornaments in the military, folk dance groups and education logos and insignia. They are also found on the Lielvārde Belt. The grass snake has also become one of the main symbols of the Lithuanian neo-pagan movement Romuva.

Roman
Virgil in his 29 BC Georgics (book III,) describes the grass snake as a large feared snake living in marshes in Calabria, eating frogs and fish.

Gallery

References

External links

 Amphibians and Reptiles of Europe

Natrix
Reptiles of Europe
Reptiles of Russia
Reptiles of Azerbaijan
Snakes of China
Reptiles described in 1758
Taxa named by Carl Linnaeus
Articles containing video clips